John Jason Thornton (born October 2, 1976) is a former American football defensive tackle of the National Football League. He was drafted by the Tennessee Titans in the second round of the 1999 NFL Draft. He played college football at West Virginia.

In addition to four years in Tennessee, Thornton also played six seasons with the Cincinnati Bengals. He retired following the 2008 season.

Early years
Thornton attended Scotland School for Veterans' Children, a residential school for relatives of veterans.

College career
Thornton attended West Virginia University and was a two-time All-Big East selection. As a senior, he was defensive co-captain and earned First-team All-America honors from The Sports Network. He also started every game his last three seasons. He also became a member of Alpha Phi Alpha fraternity.

Professional career

Tennessee Titans
Thornton was drafted by the Tennessee Titans in the second round (52nd overall) in the 1999 NFL Draft. He made his debut against the Cincinnati Bengals on September 12 and recorded one tackle. During the regular season he made 4.5 sacks which was the most made by any rookie defensive tackle. He appeared in Super Bowl XXXIV for the Titans against the St. Louis Rams.

In 2000, Thornton started in every game for the Titans and finished the season with 55 tackles. He recorded eight tackles, his seasonhigh in the game at the Buffalo Bills on September 3. Due to a shoulder injury, he only played in the first three games in 2001. In 2002, just as he did in 2000, he started in every game for the Titans and was part of the defense that limited their opponents to 89.0 rushing yards per game. He recorded 44 tackles in the regular season.

Cincinnati Bengals
In 2003, Thornton signed with the Cincinnati Bengals and recorded a career-high six sacks. In 2004, he started in every game and recorded 74 tackles. In 2005, he played 16 games, making 24 solo tackles, 18 assists, and two sacks. In 2006, he played 15 games, making 28 solo tackles, 15 assists, and two sacks. In 2007, he played 14 games, making 24 solo tackles, eight assists, and one sack. In 2008, he played in 13 games, recording 24 solo tackles, six assists and three sacks.

References

External links

Official Website

Octagon Football

1976 births
Living people
Players of American football from Philadelphia
American football defensive tackles
West Virginia Mountaineers football players
Tennessee Titans players
Cincinnati Bengals players